Events from the year 1761 in Russia

Incumbents
 Monarch – Elizabeth I

Events

Births

 Yekaterina von Engelhardt

Deaths

References

1761 in Russia
Years of the 18th century in the Russian Empire